James L. Kay II (born December 19, 1982, in Woodford County, Kentucky) is an American politician and a Democratic member of the Kentucky House of Representatives representing District 56 since his June 24, 2013 special election to fill the vacancy caused by the resignation of Representative Carl Rollins.

Education
Kay earned his BA in history and political science from the University of Kentucky and his JD from University of Kentucky College of Law.

Elections
2013 When District 56 Representative Rollins left the Legislature and left the seat open, Kay won the three-way June 25, 2013 Special election with 3,925 votes (44.0%) against Republican candidate Lyen Crews (who had run for the seat in 2010) and Independent candidate John-Mark Hack.

References

External links
Official page  at the Kentucky General Assembly
Campaign site

James Kay at Ballotpedia

1982 births
Living people
Kentucky lawyers
Democratic Party members of the Kentucky House of Representatives
People from Versailles, Kentucky
University of Kentucky alumni
University of Kentucky College of Law alumni
21st-century American politicians